My True Story is a 1951 American romantic crime drama film about a female jewel thief. It was directed by Mickey Rooney.

Plot
Ann Martin is two years into a five-year prison sentence when she is granted a conditional parole. A job and new life in a small town are waiting for her, with candy store owner Ed Praskins vouching for her and promising to produce regular reports on her conduct.

Bill Phillips, a pharmacist, introduces himself to Ann and attempts to know her better. Praskins then stuns Ann by revealing he is fronting a criminal operation run by George Trent, who is targeting a wealthy widow in town, known to all as Madame Rousseau, whose hidden cache of a valuable oil used in perfumes could be worth a fortune.

Ann is given false references and becomes Madame Rousseau's assistant and companion. Trent has already planted a chauffeur there named Foster, whose inability to keep a secret results in Trent murdering him. A distraught Ann, having developed a genuine fondness for Madame Rousseau, learns that Bill is hiding the precious oil. Trent tries to steal it, but Bill, actually working undercover, is ahead of him all the way. Ann must return to prison. Madame Rousseau, however, promises her a job when she gets out.

Cast
 Helen Walker as Ann Martin
 Willard Parker as Bill Phillips
 Elisabeth Risdon as Madame Rousseau
 Wilton Graff as Trent
 Emory Parnell as Ed Praskins

External links

My True Story at TCMDB

1951 films
American crime drama films
1951 crime drama films
American black-and-white films
American romantic drama films
1951 romantic drama films
Romantic crime films
1950s English-language films
1950s American films